Malcolm "Mal" Fox was a tennis player from the United States who competed in the mid-20th century and lost the final of the 1954 Austrian International Championships to Kurt Nielsen.

Some of his best results also include reaching the last 16 of the 1954 Monte Carlo Championships and the quarterfinals of the 1954 Torneo Godó and of the 1955 Swiss International Championships. He also reached the semifinals of the 1956 Internationales Weissenhofturnier in Stuttgart, losing to Jack Arkinstall, who would go on to win the title.

References

External links
 
 

American male tennis players
Living people
Year of birth missing (living people)